This is a list of Islamic seminaries throughout history, including the operational, historical, defunct or converted ones. This list includes mainly madrasa in the Western context, which refers to the specific type of religious school or college for the study of the Islamic religion and Islamic educations, though this may not be the only subject studied. It also includes sectarian or regional variants which have distinct characteristics and traditions, though serves the identical purposes as seminary, namely Hawza of Shi'a Islam, Nezamiyeh in the medieval Persia, Darul Uloom which has roots in South Asia, Qawmi in Bangladesh, pesantren in Indonesia, and pondok in Malaysia and Southern Thailand. This list does not include institutions which are not religious seminaries, but have an Islamic identity or charter, or devoted to sciences and arts usually associated with Islamic culture and history, namely Islamic University.

List of Islamic seminaries

The listings are in alphabetical order by country.

Bangladesh
Jamia Ahmadiyya Sunnia Kamil Madrasa, Chittagong 
Quaderia Taiyebia Alia Kamil Madrasah, Dhaka
Al-Jamiah Al-Islamiah Obaidia Nanupur, Chittagong
Al-Jamiah Al-Islamiah Patiya, Chittagong
Al-Jamiatul Ahlia Darul Ulum Moinul Islam, Chittagong
Al-Jamiatul Islamiah Azizul Uloom Babunagar, Chittagong
Al-Markazul Islami As-Salafi, Nawdapara
Islamic Research Center Bangladesh, Bashundhara
Jamia Darul Ma'arif Al-Islamia, Chittagong
Jamia Madania Angura Muhammadpur, Sylhet
Jamia Qurania Arabia Lalbagh, Dhaka
Jamia Rahmania Arabia Dhaka, Dhaka
Jamia Shari'ah Malibag, Dhaka, Dhaka
Jamia Tawakkulia Renga Madrasah, Sylhet
Jamiah Islamiah Hussainia Gohorpur, Sylhet
Jamiah Islamiah Yunusia Brahmanbaria, Brahmanbaria
Jamiatul Uloom Al-Islamia Lalkhan Bazar, Chittagong
Satpur Kamil Madrasah, Bishwanath, Sylhet.

Bosnia and Herzegovina

Ghazi Khusraw-bey's Madrasah, Sarajevo

Cyprus
Great Madrasah, Nicosia

Egypt
Al-Azhar Madrasa, Cairo
Emir Qurqumas Complex, Cairo
Madrasa of Jamal al-Din, Cairo
Madrassa of Al-Nasir Muhammad, Cairo
Qalawun complex, Cairo
Salihiyya Madrasa, Cairo
Madrasa of Sarghatmish, Cairo
Mosque and Khanqah of Shaykhu, Cairo
Sultan Al-Ghuri Complex, Cairo
Mosque-Madrassa of Sultan Hassan, Cairo

India

 Al Jamiatul Ashrafia, Uttar Pradesh, India
 Aljamea-tus-Saifiyah, Surat
 Al-Jame-atul-Islamia, Raunahi 
 Arusiyyah Madrasah, Tamil Nadu
 Baqiyat Salihat Arabic College, Tamil Nadu
 Coordination of Islamic Colleges
 Darul Uloom Deoband, Deoband
 Darul Uloom Waqf, Deoband
 Darul Uloom Nadwatul Ulama, Lucknow
 Jamia Al Barkaat Aligarh, Aligarh
 Jamia Amjadia Rizvia, Ghosi 
 Jamiatur Raza, Bareilly
 Jamia Islamia Talimuddin
 Jamia Darussalam, Tamil Nadu
 Jamia Nizamia, Hyderabad
 Markazu Saqafathi Sunniyya, Kerala
 Manzar-e-Islam, Bareilly
 Mazahir Uloom, Saharanpur

Indonesia

Pondok Pesantren Gading Mangu Perak Jombang, Jombang
Pondok Pesantren Al Manshurin Metro Lampung, Bandar Lampung
Pondok Pesantren Millenium Alfina, Nganjuk, East Java
Pondok Pesantren Minhaajurrosyidiin Jakarta, Jakarta
Pondok Pesantren Walibarokah Burengan Banjaran Kediri, Kediri
Pondok Pesantren Waria Al-Fatah, Yogyakarta
Pondok Modern Darussalam Gontor, Ponorogo

Iran
Qom Seminary, Qom
Isfahan Seminary, Isfahan
Sadr Madrasa, Isfahan
Nimavar school, Isfahan
Chaharbagh School, Isfahan
Shahid Motahari University, Tehran

Iraq
Mustansiriya Madrasah, Baghdad
Al-Nizamiyya of Baghdad, Baghdad
Hawza of Najaf, Najaf

Mali
Djinguereber Madrasa, Timbuktu
Sidi Yahya Madrasa, Timbuktu
Sankore Madrasah, Timbuktu

Morocco
Al-Attarine Madrasa, Fes
Ben Youssef Madrasa, Marrakesh
Bou Inania Madrasa, Fes
Bou Inania Madrasa, Meknes
Al Quaraouiyine Madrasa, Fes

Pakistan

Aleemiyah Institute of Islamic Studies
Jamia Amjadia Rizvia Karachi
Jamia Naeemia Lahore
Jamia Nizamia Ghousia Wazirabad
Jamia-tul-Madina
Ashraf ul Madaris, Okara
Ahsan-Ul-Uloom, Karachi
Darul Uloom Haqqania, Akora Khattak
Darul 'Uloom Karachi, Karachi
Jamia Binoria, Karachi
Jamia Faridia, Islamabad
Jamia Hafsa, Islamabad
Jamia Uloom-ul-Islamia, Karachi
Al-Kauthar Islamic University, Islamabad

Palestine
Mahkamah Madrasa, Gaza City

Saudi Arabia
Ghiyasia Madrasa, Mecca
Ghiyasia Madrasa, Medina

Singapore

Madrasah Al-Irsyad Al-Islamiah, Singapore
Madrasah Aljunied Al-Islamiah, Singapore
Madrasah Al-Maarif Al-Islamiah, Singapore
Madrasah Alsagoff Al-Arabiah, Singapore
Madrasah Al-Arabiah Al-Islamiah, Singapore
Madrasah Wak Tanjong Al-Islamiah, Singapore

Spain
Madrasah of Granada, Granada

Syria
Al-Adiliyah Madrasa, Damascus
Al-Ahmadiyah Madrasa, Aleppo
Al-Fathiyah Madrasa, Damascus
Al-Firdaws Madrasa, Aleppo
Al-Halawiyah Madrasa, Aleppo
Al-Kameliyah Madrasa, Aleppo
Al-Mujahidiyah Madrasa, Damascus
Al-Muqaddamiyah Madrasa, Aleppo
Nur al-Din Madrasa, Damascus
Al-Qilijiyah Madrasa, Damascus
Al-Rukniyah Madrasa, Damascus
Al-Sahiba Madrasa, Damascus
Al-Salimiyah Madrasa, Damascus
Al-Shadbakhtiyah Madrasa, Aleppo
Al-Shamiyah al-Kubra Madrasa, Damascus
Al-Sharafiyah Madrasa, Aleppo
Al-Sibaiyah Madrasa, Damascus
Al-Sultaniyah Madrasa, Aleppo
Al-Turantaiyah Madrasa, Aleppo
Al-Uthmaniyah Madrasa, Aleppo
Al-Zahiriyah Library, Damascus
Al-Zahiriyah Madrasa, Aleppo

Tunisia

Madrasa Al Habibia Al Kubra, Tunis
Madrasa Al Habibia Al Sughra, Tunis
Madrasa Al Husseiniya Al Kubra, Tunis
Madrasa Al Husseiniya Al Sughra, Tunis
Madrasa Al Jassoussia, Tunis
Madrasa Khaldounia, Tunis
Madrasa Asfouria, Tunis
Madrasa Andaloussiya, Tunis
Madrasa Caid Mourad, Tunis
Madrasa Ibn Tafargine, Tunis
Madrasa Bir Lahjar, Tunis
Madrasa El Jedid, Tunis
Madrasa Ech Chamaiya, Tunis
Madrasa El Achouria, Tunis
Madrasa El Bachia, Tunis
Madrasa El Bechiria, Tunis
Madrasa El Kacemia, Tunis
Madrasa El Maghribia, Tunis
Madrasa El Mountaciriya, Tunis
Madrasa El Mettichia, Tunis
Madrasa El Tawfikia, Tunis
Madrasa El Unqiya, Tunis
Madrasa El Yusefiya, Tunis
Madrasa Ennakhla, Tunis
Madrasa Ez-Zitouna, Tunis
Madrasa Hamzia, Tunis
Madrasa Hamzia, Tunis
Madrasa Mouradiyya, Tunis
Madrasa Salhia, Tunis
Madrasa Slimania, Tunis
Madrasa Saheb Ettabaâ, Tunis
Madrasa of Zawiya El Bokria, Tunis

Turkey
Büyük Aga Medrese, Amasya
Caferağa Medresseh, Istanbul
Gök Medrese, Tokat
Gök Medrese, Sivas
Hatuniye Külliyesi, Tokat
Hatuniye Medresesi, Karaman
Ince Minaret Medrese, Konya
Karatay Madrasa, Konya
Kasımiye Medrese, Mardin
Kubat Pasha Madrasa, Tarsus
Medrese of Mehmet Şakir Paşa, Mustafapaşa
Pervane Medrese, Sinop
Sahn-ı Seman Medrese, Istanbul
Seyyid Battal Gazi Complex, Seyitgazi
Şifaiye Medrese, Sivas
Sırçalı Medrese, Konya
Yakutiye Medrese, Erzurum
Vacidiye Medrese, Kütahya

United Kingdom
Jamia Al-Karam
Darul Uloom, Birmingham
Darul Uloom, Bolton
Darul Uloom, London
Darul Uloom, Blackburn, Lancashire
 Darul Uloom, Bury
Islamic Da'wah Academy, Leicester
Jamea Al Kauthar, Lancaster
Institute Of Islamic Education Dewsbury Darul Uloom

United States
Darul Uloom Al-Madania, Buffalo
Miftaah Institute, Detroit, Michigan
Zaytuna College, California
Institute of Knowledge, California
Darus Salam, Illinois 
Darul Qasim, Illinois
Al-Maqasid, Pennsylvania
Qalam, Texas
Tayseer Seminary, Knoxville

Ukraine
Zincirli Madrasa, Crimea

Uzbekistan
Abulkasym Madrassah, Tashkent
Dorut Tilavat, Bukhara
Mir-i Arab Madrassah, Bukhara
Sher-Dor Madrasah, Samarkand
Tilya-Kori Madrasah, Samarkand
Ulugh Beg Madrasa, Samarkand

Yemen
Amiriya Madrasa, Rada
Dar al-Mustafa, Tarim

Republic of Ireland
Al-Mustafa Islamic Cultural Centre Ireland

List of oldest Islamic seminaries

See also

List of Islamic educational institutions
List of Deobandi madrasas

References

Lists of Islamic universities and colleges